Hammond station is an Amtrak train station in Hammond, Louisiana, United States. It is a station on Amtrak's daily City of New Orleans route which runs between Chicago and New Orleans. The Illinois Central Railroad built the station in 1912. A freight station was built in Hammond in 1927 a few blocks south; however this station is no longer active except as a flea market and seafood restaurant.

Known locally as the Depot, Hammond's historic Amtrak station has been refurbished with a raised passenger platform. The railway, constructed in 1854 as part of the New Orleans, Jackson and Great Northern railroad, is now owned by the  Canadian National Railway. Renovated in 2008, the depot also houses the Hammond Chamber of Commerce. The architectural firm Holly & Smith received the 2008 American Institute of Architects' New Orleans Award of Merit for Historic Preservation/Restoration/Rehabilitation for its work on the station.

Amtrak provides both ticketing and baggage services at the Hammond station.

See also
Charles Emery Cate

References

External links

Hammond Amtrak Station (USA Rail-Guide -- Train Web)
Hammond Historic District

Hammond, Louisiana
Amtrak stations in Louisiana
Former Illinois Central Railroad stations
Railway stations in the United States opened in 1912
Buildings and structures in Tangipahoa Parish, Louisiana
Transportation in Tangipahoa Parish, Louisiana
1912 establishments in Louisiana